Perakamanna  is a village in Malappuram district in the state of Kerala, India.

Demographics
 India census, Perakamanna had a population of 17079 with 8358 males and 8721 females.

Transportation
Perakamanna village connects to other parts of India through Feroke town on the west and Nilambur town on the east.  National highway No.66 passes through Pulikkal and the northern stretch connects to Goa and Mumbai.  The southern stretch connects to Cochin and Trivandrum.  State Highway No.28 starts from Nilambur and connects to Ooty, Mysore and Bangalore through Highways.12,29 and 181. The nearest airport is at Kozhikode.  The nearest major railway station is at Feroke.

References

Villages in Malappuram district
Kondotty area